Avelya may refer to:
Avelya, alternative name of Əvilə, a village in Lerik District of Azerbaijan
Avelya, a diminutive of the Russian male first name Avel